David McCabe may refer to:

Dave McCabe, lead vocalist and guitarist for English rock band, The Zutons
David McCabe (photographer), British photographer
Dave McCabe, writer of The Darkside Detective
David McCabe (journalist), American technology journalist